Irami Ului Matairavula is a former Fijian politician and former Cabinet Minister.

He was elected to the House of Representatives of Fiji as a Soqosoqo Duavata ni Lewenivanua (SDL) candidate in the Tailevu South Fijian Communal Constituency at the 2001 Fijian general election. He was subsequently appointed Minister for Public Enterprises. As a Minister, he accused the Fiji Public Servants Association of treason for supporting actions by foreign unions against Fiji, and told Indo-Fijians to stick to cane-farming and not try to go into business or get elected to Parliament. He also defended vice-president Jope Seniloli's participation in the 2000 Fijian coup d'état. He was sacked from Cabinet in December 2004.

He was re-elected in the 2006 election. He lost his seat following the 2006 Fijian coup d'état.

He was later nominated to the board of the Fiji Rugby Union.

References

Living people
Year of birth missing (living people)
Soqosoqo Duavata ni Lewenivanua politicians
Politicians from Tailevu Province
I-Taukei Fijian members of the House of Representatives (Fiji)